Group A was one of two groups of the 2016 IIHF World Championship. The four best placed teams advanced to the playoff round, while the last placed team was relegated to Division I in 2017.

Standings

All times are local (UTC+3).

Matches

Sweden vs Latvia

Czech Republic vs Russia

Switzerland vs Kazakhstan

Norway vs Denmark

Latvia vs Czech Republic

Kazakhstan vs Russia

Norway vs Switzerland

Sweden vs Denmark

Latvia vs Russia

Sweden vs Czech Republic

Switzerland vs Denmark

Kazakhstan vs Norway

Switzerland vs Latvia

Sweden vs Kazakhstan

Czech Republic vs Norway

Russia vs Denmark

Czech Republic vs Kazakhstan

Denmark vs Latvia

Norway vs Sweden

Russia vs Switzerland

Kazakhstan vs Latvia

Denmark vs Czech Republic

Switzerland vs Sweden

Russia vs Norway

Denmark vs Kazakhstan

Czech Republic vs Switzerland

Latvia vs Norway

Russia vs Sweden

References

External links
Official website

A